Millicent S. Ficken (27 July 1933 – 7 July 2020), also known as Millicent Sigler Ficken, was an American ornithologist who specialized in birds' vocalizations and their social behaviors.

Biography 
Millicent Beth Sigler, known as Penny, was born in Washington, D.C., the daughter of Phares Oscar Sigler and Helen Elizabeth Richards. Because of her father's military obligations, the family traveled widely.

Education 
After graduating from Leesville High School in Leesville, Louisiana in June 1951, Sigler enrolled at Cornell University in Ithaca, New York, in September 1951. There she was awarded her Bachelor of Science degree in June 1955, the same month she married Robert William Ficken. The couple had two children, John and Carolyn. (They divorced in 1989.)

From September 1955 to January 1956, Ficken worked as a research assistant in the Bacteriology Laboratory at the University of Oklahoma. From February 1956 to September 1957 she was a lab technician working with insects at Cornell. In 1960, she earned her Ph.D. in zoology from Cornell with her dissertation titled Behavior of the American Redstart, Setophaga ruticilla (Linnaeus).

Research 
From 1960 to 1962, Ficken worked as a postdoctoral researcher at Cornell. In 1962 she published the book titled The Comparative Ethology of the Wood Warblers with Robert William Ficken. From 1963 to 1967 she was a research fellow in the Department of Zoology at the University of Maryland, College Park. From 1967 to 1975, she became an assistant professor and then an associate zoology professor at the University of Wisconsin-Milwaukee (UWM). From 1967 to 1997, she served as director of the biological field station at the same university, and in 1975 she was named a full professor.

Ficken's research interests included animal communication with a focus on the calls and social behavior of birds, especially penguins, hummingbirds and North American songbirds, on whose vocalizations she carried out several long studies. Among her "ground-breaking work" on  bird sounds was her discovery that Black-capped Chickadees "have complex calls that qualify as a language and that birds 'take turns' singing in the morning to avoid overlapping the songs of others."

In 1996 she wrote an article on the Boreal Chickadee (Poecile hudsonicus) and in 1998 wrote another on the Bridled titmouse (Baeolophus wollweberi) in Birds of North America published by the Cornell Laboratory of Ornithology.

Retirement 
After retiring from the university in 1999, she continued pursuing her own scientific studies, and in 2003 she was made Professor Emerita at the Department of Life Sciences at UWM. She liked to travel and made frequent trips to Latin America.

Ficken was living in Grafton, Wisconsin when she died on 7 July 2020 at aged 86.

Dedication 
In his orchestral work, The Chickadee Symphony, composer Craig Thomas Naylor, added the following notation to his score's title page: "Dedicated to Millicent ('Penny') Ficken." In his notes to the conductor, Naylor credited Ficken with introducing him to the Black-capped Chickadee and their "remarkably complex" vocalizations. He says he was able to incorporate four of them into his musical score.  [Penny] patiently taught me the intricacies of chickadee vocalizations. Penny is a true pioneer in avian research: she was doing digital transcriptions in the late 1970s and early 1980s when I, as an electronic musician, was still working with electronic tape. As I read the literature, I found article after article by Penny, a truly amazing output. Many of the research methods used today were pioneered by her.

Memberships 
Ficken was the first woman to be elected a fellow of both the American Ornithologists' Society and the Animal Behavior Society (she was the third woman to be elected to the latter society in 1989). She was also a member of the American Association for the Advancement of Science (AAAS) and the Society for the Study of Evolution.

Selected publications
According to JSTOR, Ficken was widely published, including more than 100 scientific articles, newsletters, proceedings and books.

References

Scientists from Washington, D.C.
Women ornithologists
American ornithologists
American women scientists
1933 births
2020 deaths
Place of death missing
20th-century American scientists
Cornell University alumni
University of Wisconsin–Milwaukee alumni
University of Wisconsin–Milwaukee faculty
American women academics
21st-century American women
20th-century American women scientists